Amblyseius perlongisetus is a species of mite in the family Phytoseiidae.

References

perlongisetus
Articles created by Qbugbot
Animals described in 1916